Ron Powers (born November 18, 1941) is an American journalist, novelist, and non-fiction writer. His works include No One Cares About Crazy People: My Family and the Heartbreak of Mental Illness in America; White Town Drowsing: Journeys to Hannibal; Dangerous Water: A Biography of the Boy Who Became Mark Twain, and Mark Twain: A Life, a finalist for the National Book Critics Circle Award. With James Bradley, he co-wrote the 2000 #1 New York Times Bestseller Flags of Our Fathers. The book won the Colby Award the following year. It was made into a movie in 2006, produced by Steven Spielberg and directed by Clint Eastwood. With Ted Kennedy, he co-wrote his memoir, True Compass in 2009.

No One Cares About Crazy People was a finalist for the PEN/E. O. Wilson Literary Science Writing Award. The Washington Post named it a Notable Book of the Year, and People named it a Top Ten Book of the Year.

As TV and radio columnist for Chicago Sun-Times, Powers won the Pulitzer Prize for Criticism in 1973 for his critical writing about television during 1972. He was the first television critic to win the Pulitzer Prize.

In 1985, Powers won an Emmy Award for his work on CBS News Sunday Morning. In 1993 he completed a biography of Muppets creator Jim Henson that was scheduled to be published in October 1994, but after objections from the Henson family Random House declined to release it.

Personal/influence
Powers was born in 1941 in Hannibal, Missouri—Mark Twain's hometown. Hannibal was influential in much of Powers' writing—as the subject of his book White Town Drowsing, as the location of the two true-life murders that are the subject of Tom and Huck Don't Live Here Anymore, and as the home of Mark Twain.  Powers has said that his fascination with Twain— the subject of two of his books—began in childhood:
"When I was a little boy in Hannibal, he was a mystic figure to me. His pictures and books and images were all over (my friend) Dulany Winkler's house, and I spent a lot of time there. I just wanted to reach out and touch him. Eventually I was able to."

In 2017, Powers published No One Cares About Crazy People, chronicling his sons' schizophrenia, and the family's experience of dealing with the American mental health system.

In addition to writing, Powers has taught nonfiction for the Bread Loaf Writers' Conference, the Salzburg Seminar in Salzburg, Austria, and at Middlebury College in Middlebury, Vermont.

Powers is married to Honoree Fleming, Ph.D., and is father to two sons; one of whom died in 2005. He currently resides in Castleton, Vermont.

Bibliography

Co-authored

References

External links

In Depth interview with Powers, January 1, 2006
NPR Fresh Air
"Fresh Air" interview with Powers, March 20th, 2017

1941 births
Living people
American television critics
Emmy Award winners
Pulitzer Prize for Criticism winners
People from Hannibal, Missouri
Writers from Missouri
Chicago Sun-Times people
20th-century American biographers
21st-century American biographers
American male non-fiction writers